Treskinnick Cross is a hamlet at Grid ref. SX2098 on the A39 main road near Poundstock in northeast Cornwall, England, United Kingdom.

References

Hamlets in Cornwall